Tetracha klagesi is a species of tiger beetle that was described by W. Horn in 1903.

References

Beetles described in 1903
Cicindelidae